Thomas Clack (6 February 1876 – 5 August 1951) was a South African cricketer. He played in four first-class matches from 1906/07 to 1910/11.

References

External links
 

1876 births
1951 deaths
South African cricketers
Border cricketers
Gauteng cricketers
Sportspeople from Qonce